The Philippine Senate Committee on Justice and Human Rights is a standing committee of the Senate of the Philippines.

Jurisdiction 
According to the Rules of the Senate, the committee handles all matters relating to:

 The organization and administration of justice, civil courts, penitentiaries and reformatory schools
 Probation
 Impeachment proceedings against constitutional officers and other officers legally removable by impeachment
 Registration of land titles
 Immigration and naturalization
 The implementation of the provisions of the Constitution on human rights
 The Department of Justice
 The Bureau of Corrections
 The National Bureau of Investigation
 The Commission on Human Rights
 The Land Registration Authority
 The Bureau of Immigration
 All matters pertaining to the efficiency and reforms in the prosecution service

Members, 19th Congress 
Based on the Rules of the Senate, the Senate Committee on Justice has 9 members.

The President Pro Tempore, the Majority Floor Leader, and the Minority Floor Leader are ex officio members.

The committee chairperson also sits at the Judicial and Bar Council as an ex officio member from July 1 to December 31 of each calendar year, as part of an arrangement with the House of Representatives Committee on Justice.

Here are the members of the committee in the 19th Congress as of January 10, 2023:

Committee secretary: Atty. Andrè B. Mortel

See also 
 List of Philippine Senate committees

References 

Justice
Parliamentary committees on Justice
Human rights in the Philippines